Gnana Soundari is a 1948 Indian Tamil-language film produced by Gemini Studios. A film by the same name and with a same story (Gnana Soundari) but with a different cast and crew was produced by Citadel Studios and was running successfully when this film was released. This film was a flop and the producer withdrew it from circuits.

Plot 
Gnanam is the only daughter of King Dharmar. From her childhood she is an ardent devotee of Mother Mary. She is ill-treated by her step mother. She grows into a beautiful young girl and becomes Gnana Soundari. The step mother plans to kill her while the king was away. Arranged by the step mother, Gnana Soundari is taken to a forest by goons. However, instead of killing her, the goons amputate both her arms and abandon her. A prince from a neighboring state comes to the forest for hunting and finds Gnana Soundari. He rescues and then falls in love with her. In spite of his father's objection the prince marries Gnana Soundari. But she has not divulged her true identity to him. Her father's kingdom is attacked by enemies and the Prince, as a neighbor, helps the father in fighting the enemies. The father (king) learns the whole story. Mother Mary restores the arms to Gnana Soundari.

Cast 
P. Kannamba as Gnana Soundari
M. K. Radha as Pilendran
V. S. Susheela as Arokkiyam
T. R. Ramachandran as Michael
L. Narayana Rao as Simiyon
T. E. Krishnamachariar as Dharmar
T. N. Meenakshi as Lenal
Velayutham as Anthony
Subbaiah Pillai as Michael

Production 
Gemini Studios has a pride of place in Tamil film world because all the films produced by them were successful at the box-office. When they started making this film it may be known to the producers that the same story is being filmed by another company. However, depending on their years of continued success, Gemini produced this film hoping their version will be received well by the people. But it turned out the other way.

Release and reception 
Gnana Soundari was released on 18 June 1948. The Indian Express praised the performances of the lead cast, Kannamba's singing, the settings, photography and recording, though the critic felt Radha was underutilised. According to historian Venkatesh Ramakrishnan, viewers disliked the film in which the characters spoke in "Brahmanical" accent for a Christian-themed film and broke the chairs of the theatre. The film stopped screening, and Vasan subsequently announced that it would not be screened in any theatre in the future. Venkatesh Ramakrishnan believes he later burnt the negatives of the film.

References 

1940s historical films
1940s lost films
1940s Tamil-language films
1948 films
Films about Christianity
Films based on Indian folklore
Gemini Studios films
Indian black-and-white films
Indian historical films
Lost Indian films
Marian apparitions in film
Portrayals of Jesus in film
Portrayals of the Virgin Mary in film
Films scored by M. D. Parthasarathy